Gipton and Harehills is a ward in the metropolitan borough of the City of Leeds, West Yorkshire, England.  It contains eight listed buildings that are recorded in the National Heritage List for England.  Of these, one is listed at Grade I, the highest of the three grades, one is at Grade II*, the middle grade, and the others are at Grade II, the lowest grade.  The ward contains the suburb of Gipton and the inner-city area of Harehills  The listed buildings consist of three churches, a former school, and four buildings at St James' Hospital.


Key

Buildings

References

Citations

Sources

 

Lists of listed buildings in West Yorkshire